Auteuil may refer to:

Places
 Auteuil, Oise, a commune in France
 Auteuil, Quebec, a former city that is now a district within Laval, Quebec, Canada
 Auteuil, Paris, a neighborhood of Paris
 Auteuil, Seine, the former commune which was on the outskirts of Paris
 Auteuil, Yvelines, a commune in France
 Neuilly-Auteuil-Passy, the informal name of the area covering Auteuil, Passy, and Neuilly-sur-Seine
 Auteuil Hippodrome, a racecourse in west Paris

People
 Aurore Auteuil (born 1981), French actress
 Daniel Auteuil (born 1950), French actor

Paris Métro stations
 Église d'Auteuil (Paris Métro)
 Michel-Ange – Auteuil (Paris Métro)
 Porte d'Auteuil (Paris Métro)

See also
 Autheuil (disambiguation)